The 1971–72 Carolina Cougars season was the 3rd season of the Cougars in the ABA. The team was 14–28 after one half of the season, with a six-game losing streak (the longest of the season) contributing to the start. They went 21–21 (with two instances of three game winning streaks) in the second half, but they lost the final spot in the playoffs by one game to The Floridians. The two teams had met up for their final match-up of the season on March 24 in Greensboro, with the Cougars having two games to play afterwards and the Floridians four, respectively. The Floridians won the game 116–115 in overtime, making their record 35–45 and the Cougars record at 33–49, which meant that it was all but assured the Cougars were eliminated, due to the Floridians clinching the playoff spot four days later with their 36th win (if they had lost all of their four games, the two teams would have been tied at 35–49, which would've necessitated a playoff). The Cougars had missed the playoffs for the 2nd straight year in a row. The team was 5th in points scored at 114.8 per game, but 10th in points allowed at 118.1 per game.

During the regular season, the Cougars played 19 games in Greensboro, 14 in Charlotte, 6 in Raleigh, 3 in Winston-Salem, and one at Fort Bragg.

Roster  
 27 Joe Caldwell – Small forward
 34 Frank Card – Forward
 -- George Carter – Small forward
 32 Warren Davis – Power forward
 54 Randy Denton – Center
 4 Ron Dorsey – Forward
 35 Wayne Hightower – Power forward
 13 Stew Johnson – Power forward
 33 Wendell Ladner – Small forward
 21 George Lehmann – Point guard
 23 Gene Littles – Point guard
 22 Ed Manning – Small forward
 24 Ted McClain – Shooting guard
 1 Jim McDaniels – Center
 44 Larry Miller – Shooting guard
 52 Tom Owens – Center
 33 George Stone – Small forward
 11 Bob Verga – Shooting guard
 21 Bob Warren – Shooting guard

Final standings

Eastern Division

Awards, records, and honors
1972 ABA All-Star Game selection (game played on January 29, 1972)
 Jim McDaniels

References

 Cougars on Basketball Reference

Carolina
Carolina Cougars
Carolina Cougars, 1971-72
Carolina Cougars, 1971-72